The 2000–01 Vancouver Canucks season was the team's 31st in the National Hockey League (NHL).

Offseason
Markus Naslund became the captain after Mark Messier signed with the New York Rangers.

Regular season

Final standings

Schedule and results

Playoffs

Player statistics

Awards and records

Transactions

Draft picks
Vancouver's draft picks at the 2000 NHL Entry Draft held at the Pengrowth Saddledome in Calgary, Alberta.

See also
2000–01 NHL season

References
 

Vancouver Canucks seasons
Vancouver C
Vancouver